Plevroma (formerly Γενή Κιόι Yeni Kioi, Turkish: Yeni Köy; Slavic: Ново село, Novo Selo) is a village in the Pella regional unit of Macedonia, Greece. It is part of the community Petraia within the municipality of Skydra. According to the 2011 census, it has a population of 261.

The nearest train stations, on the OSE's Thessaloniki–Bitola railway, are 1.3 km east (Petria), 4.2 km southeast (Episkopi) and 6 km northeast (Skydra).

Geography

Plevroma is the southwestern part of the municipality of Skydra. It is 19 km southeast of the regional unit capital of Edessa in Central Macedonia, (Greece). Plevroma borders on Imathia to the southwest and it is 24 km northwest of the Imathian capital Veria. It sits at an elevation of around 70 meters above mean sea level and the population is approximately 300 inhabitants. 

Plevroma is located 539 kilometers northwest of the present day Greek capital Athens by road, 37 kilometers north of Vergina, the royal capital of ancient Macedon and 76 kilometers northwest of Thessaloniki, the present day capital of Greek Macedonia.

Economy
Plevroma produces apples, cherries and peaches.

Demographics

References

External links
Plevroma on GTP Travel Pages (Village)
Plévroma (Pélla, Macedonia, Greece)
Map of Central Macedonia. - Plevroma NW (20)
 Primary school of Plevroma
 Kindergarten of Plevroma

Populated places in Pella (regional unit)